The Belgium national rugby league team represents Belgium in the sport of rugby league football.

For more Belgian stats, news, team results and more visit Belgium's RLEF Page.

History
The success of the 2008 Rugby League World Cup resulted in a popularity surge for the sport around the world.  As a result, a number of new nations took up the sport.  Belgium followed this trend in 2009.  Rugby League Belgium was started with a single franchise, Brabant Wallon Wavre Rugby XIII, and the creation of a national side to participate in the RLEF Euro Med Challenge and other international matches.

Under new President Yves-Michael Kazadi, Belgium were granted observer membership of the Rugby League European Federation in June 2013.

International Results
Their first international competition was in the 2009 RLEF Euro Med Challenge against Catalonia and Morocco.  In their very first international, Belgium defeated Catalonia in front of a home crowd in Wavre. Belgium came in second in the Euro Med Challenge 2009, losing to Morocco 46-12. Following this tournament, the national team took a 4-year hiatus before being granted affiliate RLEF membership and returning to international competition in 2013.

National Team Results

All-Time Results Record

Current squad
The current Squad is managed by well experienced coach Valu Bentley a former player himself he served as an assistant to the former national coach Tony Benson and was awarded the full time role upon his predecessors departure. 

2018
The Belgium squad that took on the Czech Republic on 3 October.
1.Simon Troquereaux
2.Kamal Singh
3.Martin Derom
4.Abdelouahid Zigha
5.Karim Hammadat
6.Brian Amerlynck
7.Zakaria Zoubir
8.Sofian El Hilali
9.Marco Moraschi
10.Stanislas Salongo
11.Adam Bahamou
12.Younes Hammadat
13.Jonathan Bouillon
14.Nicolas Hundziak
15.Loic Delval
16.Christophe Weynenberghe
17.Yves Kazadi

References

External links
 [www.belgiumrugby13.com/ Official site of Rugby League Belgium]

National rugby league teams
Rugby league in Belgium